Equestrian at the 2000 Summer Paralympics consisted of mixed individual and team dressage events.

Medal table

Participating nations

Medalists

References 

 

2000 Summer Paralympics events
2000
2000 in equestrian
Para Dressage